WTXT (98.1 FM, "98 TXT") is a country music-formatted radio station licensed to Fayette, Alabama, with studios in Tuscaloosa; the station is owned by iHeartMedia, Inc. WTXT serves Tuscaloosa and west-central Alabama and most of east-central Mississippi with an ERP of 100,000 watts.

Cities in WTXT's primary coverage area include Tuscaloosa, Fayette, and Aliceville in Alabama and Columbus, Starkville and West Point in Mississippi.  The station's signal also covers most of the western suburbs of Birmingham (e.g., Bessemer, Fairfield, Hueytown).

During the 1980s the callsign was WHKW and the format was Top 40/CHR. WHKW is Tuscaloosa's dominant affiliate for Rick Dees Weekly Top 40.  During the early 1990s, the callsign changed to WTXT and the country music format was adopted. Syndicated programming includes The Bobby Bones Show and After Midnite with Blair Garner hosted by Blair Garner from Premiere Radio Networks.

In 2006, WTXT added Clear Channel radio hosts Big D and Bubba to morning drive and Wild Bill Seckbach to afternoon drive.  In 2014, Bobby Bones was added to the morning lineup.  WTXT positions itself as 98 TXT, Tuscaloosa's Country.

On April 27, 2011, following massive severe weather, WTXT's 860 foot broadcast tower in Echola, Alabama was destroyed. In the Fall of 2012, WTXT began broadcasting at full-power from a new tower at the same site.

References

Previous logos

External links
WTXT official website

TXT
Country radio stations in the United States
IHeartMedia radio stations
Radio stations established in 1977
1977 establishments in Alabama